Punsalmaagiin Ochirbat (born 23 January 1942) is a Mongolian political figure and a current member of the Constitutional Court of Mongolia. He served as a president of Mongolia from 1990 to 1997 first as Chairman of the Presidium of the People's Great Khural in 1990 then, as the President of the Mongolia from 1990 to 1997, he is the first President of Mongolia to be elected by direct popular vote.

Early life and career

Ochirbat was born on 23 January 1942 in Tüdevtei district, Zavkhan Province. His father is from Govi-Altai Province. He adopted his mother's name "Punsalmaa" after his father died in 1947. From 1951 to 1960, he attended school in Ulaanbaatar and then studied at the Leningrad Higher School of Mining, graduating in 1965 with a degree in mining engineering. That same year he returned to Ulaanbaatar and joined the Mongolian People's Revolutionary Party.

In 1967, Ochirbat was named Chief Engineer at the Sharyn Gol coal mine in Darkhan-Uul Province before becoming deputy Minister of Mining and Geology in 1972. In 1976, he became a deputy in the People's Great Khural, a member of the MPRP Central Committee, and was concurrently promoted to full Minister of Mining and Geology. In 1985, he was appointed Chairman of the State Commission for Foreign Economic Relations and then became Minister of Foreign Economic Relations and Supplies when the commission was elevated to ministry status in 1987.

1990 Democratic Revolution in Mongolia

Ochirbat was named Chairman of the Presidium (titular head of state) of the People's Great Khural on 21 March 1990 following the resignation of Jambyn Batmönkh and other government leaders in the wake of the 1990 Democratic Revolution. He was re-elected to the People's Great Khural in July 1990 parliamentary elections and then chosen by Khural members for the newly created position of President of the Mongolian People's Republic. The new Constitution of 1992 changed the official name of the country to Mongolia and Ochirbat's official title to "President of Mongolia and Commander-in-Chief of the Armed Forces". The new constitution also set new presidential elections, the first to be decided by direct popular vote, for the following year, 1993.

Presidential term

Although Ochirbat strongly advocated policies of rapid national revitalisation and economic reform to break the country from its socialist past and adopt capitalism by the year 2000, he had a reputation for flexibility and willingness to compromise and his persuasiveness helped diffuse confrontations and political crises in the lead up to the first free elections in June 1993.  Nevertheless, ideological splits within the MPRP lead the party leadership to reject Ochirbat as their presidential candidate and instead nominate hardliner Lodongiin Tüdev, editor in chief of the communist newspaper Ünen.  Sensing an opportunity, a coalition of opposition parties, including the National Democrats and Social Democratic party, nominated Ochirbat as their candidate. On June 6, 1993, Ochirbat soundly defeated Tudev, winning 57.8 percent of the vote to become the first president ever elected by popular vote in Mongolia.

Ochirbat's term in office was beset by a series of political and economic crises. By the end of 1993, Ochirbat had become a harsh critic of government's failure to address the country's worsening economic situation. The country suffered food and energy shortages and high inflation. Ochirbat accused the government of not meeting its social welfare obligations. He was also critical of the Mongolian Intelligence services for failing to prevent the rise of transnational organised crime in Mongolia. He blamed over burdensome local and central bureaucracies for blocking faster economic improvement and called for reducing the overall size of the bureaucracy and speeding up privatization of government owned assets. By 1995 only 19.2% of economy had been privatised.

When in March 1994 opposition parties withdrew from parliament, Ochirbat publicly called for a protection of the rights of the minority parties and accused the ruling MPRP of exploiting the media to their advantage by limiting press coverage of parliament. He also supported reforms to election law to open elections to all parties in advance of parliamentary elections in 1996. In 1994, he vetoed a parliamentary decree to promote Cyrillic script in Mongolia and delay introduction of classical script.

In foreign affairs, Ochirbat called for a re-orientation of Mongolian foreign policy to broaden international cooperation with all nations, especially with Mongolia's two powerful neighbours China and Russia.  He rejected the transport and stationing of weapons of mass destruction in Mongolia, and declared Mongolia a nuclear free zone. In 1994, Ochirbat undertook official visits to South and Southeast Asia, signed cooperation agreements with India and Laos, and obtained financial assistance from Thailand to address the food shortage crisis. Ochirbat was the first Mongolian leader ever to officially visit the United States as well as the first Mongolian head of state in 30 years to visit Beijing, although relations with China suffered in autumn of 1995 when workers at the Mongolian embassy in Beijing discovered electronic bugs that had presumably been in place more than 10 years.

1997 presidential election

Ochirbat again ran for president in the May 1997 election, but faced a Mongolian public unhappy with the economic dislocation caused by the fast pace of reforms. The country was racked by high unemployment, 30 percent inflation, widespread shortages of foodstuffs and energy supplies and a falling GDP.  According to the World Bank, one third of population was living in poverty. Winning only 29 percent of the vote, Ochirbat lost the election to the chairman of the MPRP Natsagiin Bagabandi who had pledged to try to slow down the Government's radical reforms.

Post-politics 
After the election, Ochirbat left Mongolian politics and founded the "Ochirbat Foundation", a non-profit, non Governmental organisation that focused on poverty alleviation and self-sufficiency, environmental, and education programs.   In 2000 he became Director of the Center for Ecology and Sustainable Development at Mongolian University of Science and Technology.  In 2005 he was appointed Member of the Constitutional Court of Mongolia and re-appointed in 2010.

Awards
Ochirbat is the recipient of several awards and medals, including; Order of Chinggis Khan, Order of the Polar Star, Honoured medal of labour, Medal of the 50th, 60th, 80th anniversary of the People's Revolution, Medal of Military Force, Medal of the 800th Anniversary of the foundation of the Great Mongolian State, and Medal of the 20th Anniversary of the Democratic Revolution.

Family 
Ochirbat is married to former first lady Sharav Tsevelmaa and has two children.

References

1942 births
Living people
Speakers of the State Great Khural
Presidents of Mongolia
Mongolian People's Party politicians
Democratic Party (Mongolia) politicians
Government ministers of Mongolia
Communism in Mongolia
People from Zavkhan Province
Saint Petersburg Mining University alumni